Deaths of Garda officers may refer to several killings of officers of Garda, the police force of the Republic of Ireland:
 Deaths of Henry Byrne and John Morley (1980)
 Death of Jerry McCabe (1996)
 Death of Adrian Donohoe (2013)